Fakhruddin Baloch (born 8 January 1967) is a Pakistani former cricketer. He played first-class cricket for Karachi Whites and Pakistan Automobiles Corporation between 1989 and 1992.

See also
 List of Pakistan Automobiles Corporation cricketers

References

External links
 

1967 births
Living people
Pakistani cricketers
Karachi Whites cricketers
Pakistan Automobiles Corporation cricketers
People from Lasbela District